15 Boötis is a binary star system in the northern constellation of Boötes, located approximately 260 light years away from the Sun. It is visible to the naked eye as a dim, orange-hued star with an apparent visual magnitude of 5.45. The system has a relatively high proper motion, traversing the celestial sphere at the rate of 0.166 arc seconds per annum. It is moving away from the Earth with a heliocentric radial velocity of +16.8 km/s.

The magnitude 5.51 primary, designated component  A, is an aging K-type giant star with a stellar classification of K1 III. It is a red clump giant, which indicates it is on the horizontal branch and is generating energy through helium fusion at its core. It is around two billion years old with 1.5 times the mass of the Sun and has expanded to 10 times the Sun's radius. The star is radiating 61 times the luminosity of the Sun from its swollen photosphere at an effective temperature of 4,845 K.

Its companion, component B, is a magnitude +8.53 star was located at an angular separation of  along a position angle of 111° from the primary, as of 2015. This is the same separation it had when the system was discovered in 1936.

References

K-type giants
Horizontal-branch stars
Binary stars
Boötes
Durchmusterung objects
Bootis, 15
124679
069612
5330